The enzyme S-linalool synthase (EC 4.2.3.25) catalyzes the chemical reaction

geranyl diphosphate + H2O  (3S)-linalool + diphosphate

This enzyme belongs to the family of lyases, specifically those carbon-oxygen lyases acting on phosphates.  The systematic name of this enzyme class is geranyl-diphosphate diphosphate-lyase [(3S)-linalool-forming]. Other names in common use include LIS, Lis, and 3S-linalool synthase.

References

 
 
 

EC 4.2.3
Enzymes of unknown structure